Paul Arthur Zahl (1910 – October 16, 1985) was an explorer and biologist. He was a frequently published author and columnist as well as a respected photographer. He served as senior scientist to the National Geographic Society from 1958 to 1975.

Life and career
Zahl was born in 1910 in Bensenville, Illinois. He was an honors graduate of North Central College in Illinois, received his doctorate in experimental biology from Harvard University in 1936, and immediately became notable in cancer research at Haskins Laboratories.

He became increasingly interested in natural history. In 1939, Zahl wrote his first book, To the Lost World, about a trip he took to Mount Roraima in Venezuela.  This interest led to research at New York's Museum of Natural History, and Zahl published Blindness: Modern Approaches to the Unseen Environment (1950), Flamingo Hunt (1952), and Coro-Coro: World of the Scarlet Ibis (1954).

In the 1950s, Zahl began to concentrate on his writing and photography career with National Geographic, serving as senior scientist of natural history for the National Geographic Society from 1958 to 1975.  He always chose his subject matter rather than having it assigned, and all article photography was taken by him personally.  His subject matters included coral reefs, volcanoes, giant frogs, carnivorous plants, seahorses, scorpions, man-of-war jellyfish, piranhas, hatchetfish, butterflies, and slime molds.  Zahl discovered the tallest redwood tree known at the time in the mid-1960s, which made the magazine's cover. Zahl also photographed the world's first known albino gorilla in Africa.

Zahl was married and had two children.  At least sixteen of his articles included the entire Zahl family as they went off on adventurous vacations exploring the natural world.  Up until 1959, the covers of the magazine had the famous yellow border and the black-on-white table of contents, but no photography.  When photos were added, Eda Zahl was the first human being to grace the cover of the magazine, wearing diving apparatus.

Between expeditions, Zahl did research for the National Cancer Institute, the National Science Foundation and the Atomic Energy Commission.  During World War II, Zahl served with the Office of Science Research and Development. His articles also appeared in Atlantic Magazine, Scientific American, Scientific Monthly, and in the 1960s he wrote a column for The American Scholar. He won many awards for photography and some of his work is on permanent display in New York's Museum of Modern Art.

Zahl wrote more articles for National Geographic than anyone else in its long history, over fifty articles from 1949 to 1978.  When Zahl died of prostate cancer in October 16, 1985 in Greenwich, Connecticut at the age of 75, the National Geographic Society headquarters hung the American flag at half mast in his honor.

References

1910 births
1985 deaths
American biologists
Deaths from prostate cancer
National Geographic Society
Harvard Graduate School of Arts and Sciences alumni
People from Bensenville, Illinois
20th-century biologists
North Central College alumni
Eda Zahl, an actress who appeared on stages in Washington and elsewhere during the 1960s and 1970s, and who assisted her husband during his career with the National Geographic Society, died October 25 at her home in Greenwich, Conn. She was 86.
The cause was congestive heart failure, said her daughter-in-law, Mary Zahl. Mrs. Zahl was a longtime District resident before retiring to Connecticut in 1980.
Eda Seasongood Field was born in Long Branch, New Jersey. In 1946, she married Paul A. Zahl, who became the National Geographic Society’s senior natural scientist. Mrs. Zahl accompanied her husband on work-related travel around the world and helped edit his numerous publications.
She appeared on a National Geographic magazine cover in 1959, her family said, in a photograph taken by her husband that showed her examining coral collected from reefs near the Hawaiian islands.